Alter Der Ruine (German for: Age of the Ruin—as in: years of existence of a derelict building) is an internationally touring electronic act based out of Tucson, Arizona that began in 2005. They are known for their creative diversity and intense live shows. Their current sound is a blend of Synthpop, indie, and electro although they started as a Power noise act. Each release has seen new and sometimes drastic influences creep in leading to an ever-evolving sound.

History
In 2007 the group was signed to Sistinas Music, expanded to four members and produced their second album State of Ruin, which features a remix by Assemblage 23.

In 2008, the third album was released by an industrial music label Crunch Pod based in California, USA. In 2009, the band released Beating a Dead Horse: The Relax And Ride It Single available as a free download from Vampire Freaks. In February 2010, a compilation album This is Why We Can’t Have Nice Things was released for Europe by a German label ProNoize.

Alter der Ruine signed to Negative Gain Productions in 2011. They released their fourth and fifth albums "Son of a Bitch" and "There's Always One More Son of a Bitch" as two thirds of a trilogy of records. The third album of the trilogy was self-released by Alter der Ruine as "I Told You Not To Listen Tonight Didn't I?", which consisted of B-sides from the other two albums.

Band Breakup / Hiatus
The band announced they were done with a video posted on YouTube on January 4, 2012. An explanation followed later on the band's website announcing "The Gang Has Disbanded".

The band quietly reformed in 2013 by announcing the addition of new member Tamara. Their seventh album "I Will Remember It All Differently" is out on Negative Gain Productions.

Other projects
The members of Alter Der Ruine are involved in numerous side projects, including the synthpop group Dust Is Noise (featuring Treveloni on vocals, Mike Jenney on drums, and Rouse on synthesizers)

Jenney also does live drumming for Kevorkian Death Cycle and Assemblage 23. He contributed percussion and performed additional production duties on Tranzendance, an album released in 2015 by Arizona darkwave/dreampop band Bella Lune.

Discography

Albums
The Ruine Process (2006)
State of Ruin (2007) Sistinas Music
State of Ruin Remixes (2007)  Sistinas Music
Giants From Far Away (2008) Crunch Pod
This Is Why We Can't Have Nice Things (2010) ProNoize
Son of a Bitch (2011)  Negative Gain Productions
There's Always One More Son of a Bitch (2012) Negative Gain Productions
I Told You Not To Listen Tonight Didn't I? (2013)
I Will Remember It All Differently (2014) Negative Gain Productions

EPs 
Something Old EP (2007)
Something New EP (2007)

Singles 
Beating A Dead Horse: The Relax And Ride It Single (2009) Crunch Pod
 RLXRLXRLXRLX (2009)
Keep the Devil Off Your Back (2012) Negative Gain Productions
Bury It (2012) Negative Gain Productions

Compilations
Das Bunker: Fear of a Distorted Planet (2006) Das Bunker
Das Bunker: Bunker 54 (2007) Das Bunke, Mechanismz
Deathkey: Songs in the Key of Death (2007) Crunch Pod
Materia Fria (2007)  Sistinas Music, Crunch Pod
Endzeit Bunkertracks [Act III] (2007) Alfa Matrix

Remixes
Inure - Sick (Alter Der Ruine Mix) Alfa Matrix
Caustic - Emmanuel Lewis Handjob (Alter Der Ruine Remix)
Helltrash - I Am the Enemy (Remix By Alter Der Ruine)
To Mega Therion - The Sermon of Setekh (Pass the Collection Plate Mix)
Autoclav 1.1 - Nothing But Pillow Teeth (Alter Der Ruine Remix) Hive Records
W.A.S.T.E. - Omega 3 (ADR Remix)
Caustic - Spaff Injection (Electro-Spaff Remix by ADR) Crunch Pod
The Gothsicles - Nine Dudes Freaking Out (Nine Dudes Making Out Remixed by Alter der Ruine) WTII Records

References

External links

Musical groups from Tucson, Arizona
American noise rock music groups
American industrial music groups
Musical groups established in 2005